This article shows the rosters of all participating teams at the 2014 FIVB Volleyball Women's World Championship in Italy.

Pool A

The following is the Italian roster in the 2014 FIVB Volleyball Women's World Championship.

Head coach: Marco Bonitta

The following is the Dominican roster in the 2014 FIVB Volleyball Women's World Championship.

Head coach:  Marcos Kwiek

The following is the German roster in the 2014 FIVB Volleyball Women's World Championship.

Head coach:  Giovanni Guidetti

The following is the Argentine roster in the 2014 FIVB Volleyball Women's World Championship.

Head coach: Guillermo Orduna

The following is the Croatian roster in the 2014 FIVB Volleyball Women's World Championship.

Head coach:  Angelo Vercesi

The following is the Tunisian roster in the 2014 FIVB Volleyball Women's World Championship.

Head coach: Mohamed Messelmani

Pool B

The following is the Brazilian roster in the 2014 FIVB Volleyball Women's World Championship.

Head coach: José Roberto Guimarães

The following is the Serbian roster in the 2014 FIVB Volleyball Women's World Championship.

Head coach: Zoran Terzić

The following is the Turkish roster in the 2014 FIVB Volleyball Women's World Championship.

Head coach:  Massimo Barbolini

The following is the Canadian roster in the 2014 FIVB Volleyball Women's World Championship.

Head coach:  Arnd Ludwig

The following is the Cameroonian roster in the 2014 FIVB Volleyball Women's World Championship.

Head coach: Jean-René Akono

The following is the Bulgarian roster in the 2014 FIVB Volleyball Women's World Championship.

Head coach:  Vladimir Kuzyutkin

Pool C

The following is the American roster in the 2014 FIVB Volleyball Women's World Championship.

Head coach: Karch Kiraly

The following is the Russian roster in the 2014 FIVB Volleyball Women's World Championship.

Head coach: Yuri Marichev

The following is the Thai roster in the 2014 FIVB Volleyball Women's World Championship.

Head coach: Kiattipong Radchatagriengkai

The following is the Dutch roster in the 2014 FIVB Volleyball Women's World Championship.

Head coach: Gido Vermeulen

The following is the Kazakhstani roster in the 2014 FIVB Volleyball Women's World Championship.

Head coach:  Oleksandr Gutor

The following is the Mexican roster in the 2014 FIVB Volleyball Women's World Championship.

Head coach: Jorge Azair

Pool D

The following is the Japanese roster in the 2014 FIVB Volleyball Women's World Championship.

Head coach: Masayoshi Manabe

The following is the Chinese roster in the 2014 FIVB Volleyball Women's World Championship.

Head coach: Lang Ping

The following is the Puerto Rican roster in the 2014 FIVB Volleyball Women's World Championship.

Head coach: José Mieles

The following is the Cuban roster in the 2014 FIVB Volleyball Women's World Championship.

Head coach: Juan Carlos Gala

The following is the Belgian roster in the 2014 FIVB Volleyball Women's World Championship.

Head coach: Gert Vande Broek

The following is the Azerbaijani roster in the 2014 FIVB Volleyball Women's World Championship.

Head coach: Aleksandr Chervyakov

See also
2014 FIVB Volleyball Men's World Championship squads

References

External links
Official website

S
FIVB Volleyball Women's World Championship squads